Ali, in Iran, may refer to:
 Ali, Khuzestan (عالي - ‘Ālī)
 Ali, Razavi Khorasan (الي - Ālī)